Eric Wainaina may refer to:

Erick Wainaina (born 1973), Kenyan marathon runner
Eric Wainaina (musician) (born 1973), Kenyan singer and songwriter